= Boghal =

- Interactive map of Boghal
- Country: Senegal
- Time zone: UTC+0 (GMT)

Boghal is a settlement in Senegal.
